The 2013–14 UMass Lowell River Hawks men's basketball team represented the University of Massachusetts Lowell during the 2013–14 NCAA Division I men's basketball season. This was the River Hawks first year in Division I. They were coached by first year head coach Pat Duquette and played most of their home games at Costello Athletic Center. Three games were played at the Tsongas Center at UMass Lowell for the 2013-2014 season. They are members of the America East Conference. They finished the season 10–18, 8–8 in American East play to finish in fifth place. As part of their transition to Division I, they are  ineligible for post season play until the 2017–18 season.

Roster

Schedule

|-
!colspan=9 style="background:#CC3333; color:#333399;"| Regular Season

References

UMass Lowell River Hawks men's basketball seasons
UMass Lowell
UMass Lowell River Hawks men's basketball
UMass Lowell River Hawks men's basketball